Tods Corner is a rural locality in the local government area of Central Highlands in the Central region of Tasmania. The 2016 census has a population of 8 for the state suburb of Tods Corner.

History
Tods Corner is a confirmed suburb/locality. The name has been in use since 1848 (Placenames Tasmania 1357D) and is believed to be that of an early settler.

Geography
The Great Lake forms part of the western boundary. Tods Corner Power Station is in the locality. The adjacent arm of Great Lake is also called Tods Corner.

References

Localities of Central Highlands Council
Towns in Tasmania